Wilkens–Robins Building is a historic loft building located at Baltimore, Maryland, United States. It was built in 1871 and is a five-story, six-bay brick structure with a cast iron front. The facade features an expanse of oversized windows and are the highlights of one of the few surviving cast-iron facades in Baltimore.

The Wilkens–Robins Building was listed on the National Register of Historic Places in 1980.

References

External links
, including undated photo, at Maryland Historical Trust

Cast-iron architecture in Baltimore
Renaissance Revival architecture in Maryland
Commercial buildings on the National Register of Historic Places in Baltimore
Commercial buildings completed in 1871
Downtown Baltimore